The Sabah keelback (Hebius flavifrons) is a nonvenomous colubrid endemic to Borneo.

Description
Adults are about 54 cm (21 inches) in total length, of which about 18 cm (7 inches) is tail. Body slender; midbody scales 19, keeled; ventrals 149–157; subcaudals 92–101; dorsum olive-grey, with darker markings; a distinctive white to yellowish-cream spot on snout.

Habitat and behavior
It is frequently encountered in rivers in the plains and midhills, seen swimming with its head held out of water.

Diet
Its diet includes frog eggs, tadpoles and frogs.

Reproduction
Nothing is known about its reproductive biology.

Geographic range
It is endemic to Borneo. It has been found in Brunei, Sabah and Sarawak.

References

Hebius
Reptiles of Indonesia
Reptiles of Malaysia
Reptiles of Brunei
Endemic fauna of Borneo
Reptiles described in 1887
Taxa named by George Albert Boulenger
Reptiles of Borneo